Eric Baldwin (born in Beaver Dam, Wisconsin) is a professional poker player from Henderson, Nevada who won the 2009 World Series of Poker $1,500 No Limit Hold'em event earning $521,991 and was the runner-up in the World Poker Tour $25,000 No Limit Hold'em WPT Championship Event, earning $1,034,715 and is the 2009 Winner of the CardPlayer Player of the Year Award.

Baldwin finished in 59th place out of 7,319 players that enter in the 2010 World Series of Poker Main Event, earning $138,285.

As of 2010, his total live tournament winnings exceed $3,200,000.

World Series of Poker bracelet

Notes

External links
Team UB profile
NBC Sports profile - Eric Baldwin
CardPlayer.com profile - Eric Baldwin

American poker players
World Series of Poker bracelet winners
People from Beaver Dam, Wisconsin
People from Henderson, Nevada
Living people
Year of birth missing (living people)